The 2012 Vermont gubernatorial election took place on November 6, 2012, to elect the Governor of Vermont. Incumbent Democratic Governor Peter Shumlin won re-election to a second term, making this the only one of his gubernatorial elections in which he won a majority of the vote. In his 2010 and 2014 races, the Vermont General Assembly was required to choose a winner in accordance with the state constitution, because no candidate won a majority.

Democratic nomination

Candidates
 Peter Shumlin, incumbent

Republican nomination

Candidates
 Randy Brock, state senator and former state auditor

Declined
 Brian Dubie, former lieutenant governor and 2010 gubernatorial nominee
 Thom Lauzon, mayor of Barre
 Patricia McDonald, Vermont Republican Party Chairwoman and former state representative
 Roy Newton, newspaper publisher (did not file)
 Tom Salmon, state auditor
 Phil Scott, lieutenant governor
 Mark Snelling, 2010 candidate for lieutenant governor and son of former governor Richard Snelling

Progressive nomination

Candidates
 Martha Abbott, chairwoman of the Vermont Progressive Party (resigned nomination in order to aid Shumlin by avoiding split in progressive/liberal votes)

General election

Candidates
 Randy Brock (R), state senator and former state auditor
 Dave Eagle (Liberty Union)
 Cris Ericson (U.S. Marijuana), perennial candidate who also ran for the U.S. Senate
 Emily Peyton (Independent)
 Peter Shumlin (D), incumbent

Debates
Complete video of debate, October 13, 2012 - C-SPAN

Predictions

Polling

Results

See also
 2012 United States presidential election in Vermont

References

External links
Elections and Campaign Finance Division at the Vermont Secretary of State
Campaign sites (Archived)
 Randy Brock for Governor
 Peter Shumlin for Governor

Vermont
Gubernatorial
2012